The women's tournament of water polo at the 2019 Pan American Games in Lima, Peru took place between 4 and 10 August at the Villa María del Triunfo Aquatic Centre. The winner of the competition qualifies directly for the 2020 Summer Olympics in Tokyo, Japan.

Qualification
A total of eight teams qualified to compete in the tournament. The numbers in parenthesis represents the number of participants qualified.

Format
Teams are split into 2 round-robin groups of 4 teams each, where the final positions in each group will determine seedings for the knockout stage. The losing teams from the quarterfinals stage will compete in a separate single elimination bracket to determine fifth through eighth places in the final rankings.

Preliminary round

Group A

Group B

Final round

Bracket

All times are local (UTC−5).

Quarterfinals

5–8th place semifinals

Semifinals

7th Place match

5th Place match

Bronze Medal match

Gold Medal match

Ranking and statistics

Final ranking

Top goalscorers
Report

References

Women
2019 in women's water polo